is a district located in Fukui Prefecture, Japan.

As of October 1, 2005, the district has an estimated population of 20,766 and a density of 220.12 persons per km2. The total area is 94.34 km2.

Towns and villages 
The district has one town:

 Eiheiji

History

Recent mergers
 On February 13, 2006 - The town of Matsuoka and the village of Kamishihi were merged into the expanded town of Eiheiji.

Districts in Fukui Prefecture